Sara Morganti (born 6 March 1976) is an Italian Paralympic equestrian who competed at the 2020 Summer Paralympics, in Equestrian, winning a bronze medal in Individual championship test and in Individual freestyle test.

Biography
She rode the horse Royal Delight from the 2012 London Paralympics. In 2014, she was Allianz Athlete of the Month. Starting in 2018, she has been president of the National Commission for Paralympic Athletes, of the Italian Paralympic Committee.

References

External links 
 
 Sara Morganti at FEI
 Royal Delight (her horse) at FEI

1976 births
Living people
Paralympic equestrians of Italy
Medalists at the 2020 Summer Paralympics
People from the Province of Lucca
Paralympic bronze medalists for Italy
Italian female equestrians
Equestrians at the 2020 Summer Paralympics
20th-century Italian women
21st-century Italian women